Justas Paleckis ( – 26 January 1980) was a Lithuanian Soviet author, journalist and politician. He was nominal acting president of Lithuania after the Soviet invasion while Lithuania was still ostensibly independent, in office from 17 June to 3 August 1940.  He then remained as the nominal head of state of the Lithuanian SSR until 1967.

Life and career
Paleckis was born in Telšiai in 1899 in to the family of a blacksmith of noble origin. In 1926–1927, he was a director of the Lithuanian official news agency, ELTA. He later voiced opposition to the ruling elite in Lithuania; in this way, he became a suitable candidate for the Lithuanian communists (subordinate to Soviet envoy Vladimir Dekanozov) to become the puppet leader of Lithuania in the Soviets' planned takeover of the country in 1940. Paleckis had connections to the Lithuanian Communist Party from the early 1930s.

After President Antanas Smetona fled to the US when the Soviet Union occupied the country, Prime Minister Antanas Merkys became acting president. A day after Smetona left the country, Merkys announced he had formally ousted Smetona and taken over the presidency himself. He then appointed Paleckis prime minister. Merkys himself resigned, making Paleckis acting president as well. These moves are now considered illegal and unconstitutional, since Smetona never resigned. As such, Lithuanian government records do not recognize Paleckis as a legitimate president.

By this time, Lithuania had been occupied by Soviet troops. Paleckis' appointment as Prime Minister was made under orders form the Soviet embassy in Kaunas. Aided by specialists sent in from Moscow, Soviet deputy foreign minister Vladimir Dekanozov worked through the Lithuanian Communist Party, while the cabinet of ministers, headed by Paleckis, served an administrative function. Dekanozov and Paleckis brought a number of non-Communists into the first "People's government", but in historical retrospect it is clear that they constituted window dressing for the Soviet takeover.

In order to save face, the Soviet Union attempted to cover its annexation of the Baltic States with a cloak of legality. Therefore, Moscow ordered the Paleckis government to carry out elections for a "People's Seimas" on 14–15 July.  Voters were presented with a single list of candidates containing only Communists and their allies. When the People's Seimas met on 21 July, it had only one order of business—a resolution declaring Lithuania a Soviet republic and requesting admission to the Soviet Union, which was unanimously carried. A few days later, Moscow "accepted" the request—thus giving credence to the official line that Lithuania had carried out a socialist revolution independent of Moscow's influence and requested admission to the Soviet Union. Since regaining independence in 1990, Lithuania has maintained that since Smetona never resigned, Merkys and Paleckis had no legitimate claim to the presidency, rendering all acts leading up to the Soviet annexation  ipso facto void.

Paleckis remained as head of state, a post which was named Chairman of the Presidium of the Supreme Soviet of the Lithuanian SSR, until 1967. However, the real power now lay with local Communist Party boss Antanas Sniečkus. As nominal head of state, Paleckis personally signed orders authorizing the mass deportation of several figures from independent Lithuania. With his agreement, Merkys and Minister of Foreign Affairs Juozas Urbšys were deported to the Russian SFSR. The intelligentsia and Lithuania's elite were considered as enemies and were among the first sentenced to deportation or death. He worked closely with NKVD residents in Lithuania (M. Gedvilas, M. Mickis). Paleckis signed documents and, as a representative of Soviet Russia, took responsibility for the deportations.

During 1940–1953, some 132,000 Lithuanians were deported to remote areas of the USSR: Siberia, the Arctic Circle zone and Central Asia. More than 70% of the deportees were women and children. During the same period, another 200,000 people were thrown into prisons. Some 150,000 of them were sent to the Gulag (Soviet labor camps), situated mostly in Siberia. 

He served as Chairman of the Soviet of Nationalities from 1966 to 1970.

His son Justas Vincas Paleckis is a politician and Member of the European Parliament and an active politician.

Paleckis was also awarded the Hero of Socialist Labour of the Soviet Union.

References 

1899 births
1980 deaths
Burials at Antakalnis Cemetery
People from Telšiai
People from Telshevsky Uyezd
Prime Ministers of Lithuania
Central Committee of the Communist Party of the Soviet Union candidate members
Members of the Supreme Soviet of the Soviet Union
Chairmen of the Soviet of Nationalities
Communist Party of Lithuania politicians
Heads of state of the Lithuanian Soviet Socialist Republic
Members of the Supreme Soviet of the Lithuanian Soviet Socialist Republic
Lithuanian people of World War II
World War II political leaders
Lithuanian collaborators with the Soviet Union (1940–41)
Recipients of the Order of Lenin
Heroes of Socialist Labour